Andropogon hallii (sand bluestem, sand hill bluestem, Hall's bluestem, Hall's beardgrass, prairie bluestem, turkey-foot) is a sod-forming perennial species in the grass family, Poaceae. It is a bunchgrass which grows in tufts and can reach  in height under favorable conditions.

Sand bluestem is native to North America. It is found growing from the Mississippi River west to the Rocky Mountains and from Canada to Chihuahua, Mexico.  It prefers sandy soils and will dominate in areas that average less than 30 inches of rain annually.

Sand bluestem is a high quality forage with good palatability for livestock, but it cannot stand up to continuous heavy grazing. It is also valuable as browse for wildlife and as a source of edible seeds and nesting habitat for upland birds.

References

hallii
Bunchgrasses of North America
Grasses of the United States
Grasses of Canada
Native grasses of the Great Plains region
Flora of Mexico
Flora of the United States
Flora of the Canadian Prairies
Forages
Taxa named by Eduard Hackel